Hong Qi, better known as Hong Qigong, is a fictional character in the wuxia novel The Legend of the Condor Heroes and its sequel, The Return of the Condor Heroes, by Jin Yong. Best known for his most powerful martial arts (the Eighteen Subduing Dragon Palms and the Dog Beating Staff Technique), Hong Qigong is the chief of the Beggars' Gang and one of the Five Greats, the five most powerful martial artists in the jianghu (martial artists' community) of his time. He plays a significant role in the first novel by imparting his skills to the protagonists, Guo Jing and Huang Rong. Huang Rong also succeeds him as the Beggars' Gang's chief. In the second novel, he makes a brief appearance and teaches the protagonist Yang Guo the Dog Beating Staff Technique before dying together with his old rival Ouyang Feng.

Fictional character biography

The Legend of the Condor Heroes 
Hong Qigong was formerly a slave of Jurchen officials of the Jin Empire before he escaped and joined the Beggars' Gang and eventually became the gang's chief. He is nicknamed "Northern Beggar" after emerging as one of the top five champions of a martial arts contest on Mount Hua, and is also known as the "Nine Fingered Divine Beggar" after he cut off his right forefinger in remorse for failing a mission, which cost a man's life, due to his gluttony.

Hong Qigong makes his first appearance when Huang Rong is preparing a dish, beggar's chicken, for Guo Jing. Attracted to the fragrant scent of the dish, he asks to taste it. Huang Rong examines his physical appearance, notices his missing finger and Dog Beating Staff, and concludes that he is the "Northern Beggar". She then makes a deal with Hong Qigong for him to train Guo Jing in martial arts; in return, she will prepare fine cuisine for him. Hong Qigong agrees and teaches Guo Jing the Eighteen Subduing Dragon Palms.

Hong Qigong later loses all his inner energy when he uses it to purge venom from his body after he has been poisoned by "Western Venom" Ouyang Feng, his former rival. He decides to pass his position as chief of the Beggars' Gang to Huang Rong so he teaches her the Dog Beating Staff Technique, which only the chief can learn.

The Return of the Condor Heroes 
Hong Qigong makes a brief appearance in the second novel while roaming the jianghu as a carefree old beggar in search of culinary delights. He has regained his inner energy at this point. At Mount Hua, he encounters the protagonist, Yang Guo, as well as his old rival, Ouyang Feng, who has become insane but still has his powers. Hong Qigong fights with Ouyang Feng again to the point of sheer exhaustion, but neither of them is willing to back down, so they use Yang Guo as an intermediary by teaching him their respective skills and asking him to perform the skills for the other to see. During this time, Yang Guo learns the Dog Beating Staff Technique from Hong Qigong. Eventually, both Hong Qigong and Ouyang Feng realise that neither of them can win the other so they give up and die together in the midst of laughter and forgotten past feuds. Yang Guo then buries them beside each other on Mount Hua.

Martial arts and skills

 Eighteen Subduing Dragon Palms
 Dog Beating Staff Technique
 Carefree Fist is a set of fist techniques created by Hong Qigong in his youth. The skill is smooth and visually appealing but lacks real power.
 Rain of Petals is created by Hong Qigong to counter Ouyang Ke's snake formation after he sees Huang Rong's sewing kit. It involves using common sewing needles as dart-like throwing weapons to pin down the snakes.

In film and television 
Notable actors who have portrayed Hong Qigong in films and television series include Ku Feng (1977–1978, 1983), Lau Dan (1983, 1994–1995), Chiang Sheng (1988), Lau Kong (1993), Jacky Cheung (1993–1994), Marco Ngai (1994) and Bryan Leung (1998, 2008).

Notes 

Jin Yong characters
The Legend of the Condor Heroes
The Return of the Condor Heroes
Condor Trilogy
Fictional wushu practitioners
Fictional slaves
Fictional beggars
Literary characters introduced in 1959
Characters in novels of the 20th century
Fictional Song dynasty people